San Tsuen is the name or part of the name of several places in Hong Kong:

 San Tsuen in Sha Tau Kok
 San Tsuen (Tsuen Wan District), a village in Tsuen Wan District

Other places include:
 Ha Mei San Tsuen
 Kam Tin Shing Mun San Tsuen
 Lam Tsuen San Tsuen
 Pan Chung San Tsuen
 Ping Shan San Tsuen
 Shui Tsiu San Tsuen